Padungan is a city in Sarawak, Malaysia.

Padungan may also refer to:
Padungan (state constituency), represented in the Sarawak State Legislative Assembly